The SS Op ten Noort was a luxury Passenger ship built by Nederlandsche Scheepsbouw Maatschappij in Amsterdam, Netherlands and completed in 1927. The ship was built for and owned by Koninklijke Paketvaart-Maatschappij (Royal Packet Navigation Company). Op ten Noort means Up North. In December 1941 she became a Royal Netherlands Navy hospital ship. Shortly after her conversion the Empire of Japan stole the ship and renamed her Tenno Maru. To cover up the war crimes against the ship and her medical crew, at the end of the war, she was sunk on August 17, 1945. Before sinking her, she was again renamed to Hikawa Maru No.2, after the Hikawa Shrine, Saitama.

Dutch East Indies
As a luxury Passenger ship, the Op ten Noort was put to service in the what was called Dutch East Indies, now Indonesia. Koninklijke Paketvaart Maatschappij headquarters were in Java at this time. Op ten Noort moved both passengers and cargo on the very profitable routes. On November 9, 1927 she had her maiden voyage.  Her 1927 route was from Singapore to Bangkok to Saigon to Manila to Maluku Island to Bali to Jakarta. After a few years the route changed to Java to Batavia to Muntok to Belawan to Deli Serdang Regency. Op ten Noort had a sister ship, the SS Plancius that operated in the South Pacific also. For fourteen years she serviced these towns as a luxury ship. The 130 First Class cabins had access to lounges, bars, smoking room and a Tropical Verandah. For the very wealthy there were two Deluxe Suites with lounge, bedroom, two bathrooms, private deck (Veranda). She had 18 Second Class cabins. There was for day passenger a Tweendeck and a cafeteria.

World War II
With the outbreak of World War II the SS Op Ten Noort was taken over by the Royal Dutch Navy in December 1941 as she docked in Jakarta. There she was refitted into a hospital ship. She was painted all white with huge red crosses. The Dutch Government officially reported to the Japanese Ministry of Foreign Affairs at the Swedish embassy in Tokyo of the changes to SS Op Ten Noort. She was now an operational hospital ship, as thus would not be part of the war effort, that is she would not transport any weapons or active troops. On February 4, 1942 the Japanese Ministry of Foreign Affairs and Naval Ministry acknowledges Op Ten Noort status change through the Swedish embassy. On February 21, 1942, now completed, she departed on her first trip to help wounded allies. But only a few hours out of port, the Op Ten Noort was bombed by the Empire of Japan in the Java Sea. One surgeon and three nurses were killed, eleven were badly wounded. Dutch Government sent a strong note of protest of the bombing to Japan, through the Embassy of Sweden. After repairs, on 28 February 1942, she was commandeered by the Japanese destroyer Amatsukaze and Japanese destroyer Murasame near Bawean Island, stopping her rescue work again. Japanese forced her crew to transport their allies POWs to Japan POW camps. The first POW move was that of 59 POWs from the USS Perch that were on the Japanese destroyer Ushio. By the end of March 1942 she had 970 POWs, most were from the 800 survivors of  that sank on March 1, 1942. The prisoners of war were kept in very poor conditions and fed only a cup of rice a day, Op Ten Noort became what is called a Japanese hell ship. On 20 December 1942 she was renamed the  Tenno Maru an official Japanese Hospital Ship. The Dutch ship crew was taken off the ship and became POWs at Camp Myoshi, near Yokohama. Japan had signed the Hague Convention X of 1907 that stated attacking a hospital ship is a war crime.

With the war coming to an end, the ship was changed in October 1944. A second dummy smokestack was added to "hide her". She was renamed the  Hikawa Maru No.2. She both served as a hospital ship and transported war cargo. For the latter part of 1944 and into 1945 she traveled from Singapore and Manila with a cargo of looted gold and other valuable Japanese conquests. The weeks before Japan surrender she arrived in Japan with gold, platinum, diamonds and gems. On August 15, 1945, the Japanese officially announced surrender. To cover up the war crimes and to hide the stolen loot, the ship was sunk on August 17, 1945, at Wakasa Bay in 400 feet of water. Two 328 pound explosive charges were placed in the bottom of the hull and detonated by remote controls to sink the ship.

After the war
The Netherlands thought the Op Ten Noort sank as the  Tenno Maru  near Makassar by a sea mine, not knowing about the Hikawa Maru No.2 plot. In 1953, the Dutch Government filed a 700 million Yen claim against the Japanese government for compensation. After years of talks, in the end 100 million Yen ($500,000) were paid to the Dutch Government in 1978. Information about the loot in the shipwreck is not public.

In 2017, the Op Ten Noort wreck was found and the Japanese broadcasting company NHK made a documentary about the ship.

See also
Japanese war crimes

AHS Centaur

References

External links

1927 ships
Maritime incidents in August 1945
Hospital ships
Japanese war crimes
Japanese hell ships
Naval ships of the Netherlands captured by Japan during World War II